The 2012 Big East women's basketball tournament took place in March 2012 at the XL Center in Hartford, Connecticut. The winner will receive the Big East Conference's automatic bid to the 2012 NCAA tournament. This was the third consecutive year Big East tournament to include all 16 of the conference's teams. The teams finishing 9 through 16 in the regular season standings played first round games, while teams 5 through 8 received byes to the second round. The top 4 teams during the regular season received double-byes to the quarterfinals.

Final regular season standing

‡ Regular season Big East champion

Bracket

OT - Denotes Overtime Game

See also 
2012 NCAA Women's Division I Basketball Tournament
2012 Big East men's basketball tournament

External links 
2012 Big East Women's Basketball Tournament website
2012 Big East Women's Basketball Tournament Bracket

References 

Big East women's basketball tournament
 Tournament